During the 2007–08 season, Barnsley F.C. competed in the Championship, where they finished 18th, and also competed in the FA Cup and League Cup, where they were eliminated in the semi-final and second round respectively.

First-team squad

Squad at end of season

Left club during season

Preparation for 2007/08
At the end of the season, Barnsley announced the release of first team members Antony Kay, Neil Austin, and Marc Richards. Strikers Daniel Nardiello and Paul Hayes then left to join QPR and Scunthorpe United, respectively. Paul Heckingbottom also agreed a loan move to his former club Bradford City, until the end of January. Manager Simon Davey was quite prolific in the summer transfer window, bringing in no less than fourteen new players and spending around £1 million, the majority of this on three strikers.

New players
Strikers: Kayode Odejayi (Cheltenham), Miguel Mostto (Cienciano), Kim Christensen (Odense Boldklub)

Midfield: Anderson Silva de Franca (On loan from Everton), Jamal Campbell-Ryce (Southend United), Dominik Werling (Sakaryaspor), Andy Johnson (Leicester City), Rohan Ricketts (Wolverhampton Wanderers)

Defenders: Rob Kozluk (Sheffield United),  Dennis Souza (RAEC Mons), Lewin Nyatanga (on loan from Derby), Stephen Foster (Burnley), Marciano Bruma (Sparta Rotterdam)

Goalkeeper: Heinz Muller (Lillestrøm S.K.)

2007–08 season

League table

Overview

With the departure of six first team players (Daniel Nardiello, Paul Hayes, Antony Kay, Paul Heckingbottom, Neil Austin and Marc Richards), Simon Davey dipped heavily into the summer transfer market and ultimately brought in fourteen new players, the majority of whom were foreign. The most successful of these signings included goalkeeper Heinz Muller, midfielders Anderson and Jamal Campbell-Ryce, and a new defensive line-up made up of Rob Kozluk, Dennis Souza, Stephen Foster and Lewin Nyatanga (who returned on an extended loan spell after becoming a fan favourite).

Barnsley had a very positive start to the season, surpassing expectations and finding themselves in the top six of the Football League Championship with ten games played. Most of the summer signings found their way into the squad early on, making it quite common for there only to be two or three players in the starting eleven who were with the club in the previous season. Top scorer Brian Howard was rumored to have attracted Premiership interest along with new signings Heinz Muller, Dennis Souza and even manager Simon Davey. The team managed to maintain a decent level of consistency, remaining in the top half of the table throughout the first half of the season. Derby striker Jon Macken arrived on loan in November, and scored his first three goals for the club in his last two matches before being recalled by Derby at the end of December along with Lewin Nyatanga. Barnsley's form finally began to stutter through December and January, when they went for eight league games without a victory and dropped to 16th in the table. They did, however, beat both Blackpool and Southend in the FA Cup to secure passage to the last sixteen.

The first new signing of the January window was Spanish midfielder Diego León, followed by a short-term loan signing for Miguel Tininho and a controversial loan deal for ex-reds striker Daniel Nardiello (who had turned down a contract offer to leave the club for QPR the previous summer). Shortly before the transfer window closed, Davey signed previously-loaned players Jon Macken from Derby County and Anderson from Everton (each for an undisclosed six-figure fee), as well as securing yet another loan spell for Lewin Nyatanga, with a fee agreed for a permanent summer switch. Outgoing from the club was reserve goalkeeper Nick Colgan to Championship rivals Ipswich, so an injury to first-choice keeper Heinz Muller forced a late loan deal for goalkeeper Tony Warner on a month's loan from Fulham. Anderson also suffered an injury in late February which would keep him out for up to seven months.

Barnsley continued to maintain their lower mid-table position in the Championship, unable to put a winning streak together. On 16 February, the team travelled to Anfield to play Liverpool in the 5th round of the FA Cup and pulled off a surprise 2–1 victory, with a strong defensive display and a 'Man of the Match', 'Player of the Round' performance from loaned keeper Luke Steele (who was brought in at the last minute for cup-tied Tony Warner). After conceding a goal in the first half, it was Stephen Foster who equalised in the second and captain Brian Howard who scored the last-gasp winner which allowed them to progress to the quarter finals for the first time since 1999, where they would face Chelsea at Oakwell. Here, the Tykes put in a 'sensational' performance against the FA Cup holders and 'Player of the Round' Kayode Odejayi's second-half header (only his second goal of the season) was enough to put the Yorkshire side into the semi-final for the first time since they won the cup in 1912. Even Chelsea boss Avram Grant admitted after the game that the Championship side fully deserved their win Davey hails giantkillers Barnsley. With Portsmouth the only Premiership side remaining in the competition, what had begun as a shock result at Anfield had now developed into a genuine chance to reclaim their FA Cup glory, and when they were drawn against Cardiff City in the semi-finals a repeat of the historic final versus West Bromwich Albion was well on the cards. However, in front of a Wembley crowd of 82,752 they narrowly lost the game 1–0 to Cardiff thanks to an 8th-minute strike from Joe Ledley.

Meanwhile, in the league, losses against Crystal Palace, Sheffield United and Burnley saw them drop to a precarious position and relegation fears were brewing, but a surprise 3–0 away win at Watford followed by a 1–2 victory at Preston North End were a big boost to their survival hopes. Their survival was secured on the second-to-last matchday with a 3–0 home victory over Charlton, and they eventually finished at 18th in the league with 55 points.

Short match reports
Match One – Barnsley 1–4 Coventry City

Barnsley started off their second season back in the Championship in the worst way possible way with this 4–1 home drubbing. Leon McKenzie put the Sky Blues in front before Brian Howard equalised from the penalty spot. In the second half, goals from Kevin Kyle, Julian Gray and Michael Mifsud tied up an easy win for the sky blues.

League Cup Round One – Barnsley 2–1 Darlington

The Reds faced Darlington in the League Cup First Round three days later. After a dull first half, Reds substitute Istvan Ferenczi, who replaced Miguel Mostto scored with his first touch, a header from Rob Kozluk's cross. Former Tyke Tommy Wright then levelled for Darlington before Reds skipper Paul Reid rifled a bouncing ball into the net to seal Barnsley's passage to the next round.

Match Two – Colchester United 2–2 Barnsley

Barnsley's first away game ended 2–2 at Colchester United. Brian Howard grabbed the first goal of the game for Barnsley after Dean Gerken brought down Kayode Odejayi and was sent off. Close to half time veteran Teddy Sheringham netted his first goal for Colchester. After the restart Matthew Connolly scored Colchester's second goal, heading in Johnnie Jackson's cross. On fifty minutes Barnsley skipper Paul Reid was sent off after elbowing Teddy Sheringham. Both teams were down to ten men. After Grant McCann's corner, Johnnie Jackson was guilty of handball, Brian Howard stepped up and struck the ball into the top right hand corner. The hard-fought game ended 2–2.

Match Three – Barnsley 3–2 Plymouth Argyle

The Reds got their first win of the season at home to Plymouth in a game that shouldn't have been so nervy. Istvan Ferenczi put the Reds ahead after a neat move. A bullet free-kick by Dominik Werling sent them in 2–0 up. Brian Howard effectively put the game beyond doubt with a header. But Barry Hayles and Nick Chadwick reduced the deficit to 3–2 but Barnsley held on.

League Cup Round Two – Newcastle United 2–0 Barnsley

Premier League class showed in the Magpies 2–0 win. The Reds held out until half time at 0–0. In the 57th minute, Alan Smith released Michael Owen who slid the ball under Barnsley keeper Heinz Muller. Obafemi Martins then doubled the lead on 86 minutes with a shot that was thought to be taken down by the arm but the goal was awarded.

Match Four – West Bromwich Albion 2–0 Barnsley

West Brom taught Barnsley harsh lessons at the Hawthorns in a comfortable 2–0 victory. Filipe Teixeira lashed Albion in front after thirty minutes and Craig Beattie benefited from poor defending and beat Heinz Muller with ease. The Reds hardly troubled the hosts despite although Anderson was unlucky to see his effort saved by Dean Kiely.

Match Five – Barnsley 2–0 Scunthorpe United

After a modest start Barnsley picked up the pace and managed to bag a couple of goals. An own goal from Marcus Williams just before half time and Kayode Odejayi in the 65th minute. This gained Barnsley their first clean sheet of the season and a 2–0 win.

Match Six – Stoke City 0–0 Barnsley

A second clean sheet saw Barnsley do well to maintain possession and both teams had a fair number of chances to take all three points.

Match Seven – Southampton 2–3 Barnsley

An absolutely thrilling away game ended in victory for Barnsley, two free kicks from Grant McCann giving the Tykes a good lead in the first half. Marek Saganowski managed to pull one back for the home side just before half-time. Reds full-back Dominik Werling was sent off after 27 minutes, and the game ended in memorable fashion with a goal at each end deep in stoppage time; Inigo Idiakez with the equalizer for Southampton only for Martin Devaney to scare a last-minute winner.

Match Eight – Barnsley 1–1 Cardiff City

A decent game with the reds dominating the majority of the first half. However, Barnsley fell behind courtesy of Cardiff's Jimmy Floyd Hasselbaink on the 73rd minute. Nevertheless, the reds managed an equaliser on the 83rd minute through a Brian Howard header.

Match Nine – Barnsley 3–0 Bristol City

Barnsley's most decisive win of the season yet came against a Bristol City side who had thus far been undefeated in the league. The team created chances throughout and for the most part dominated the first half, but it was in the second half that goals from Brian Howard, Dennis Souza and Martin Devaney exposed the shortcomings of the away team and led the reds to victory.

Match Ten – Charlton Athletic 1–1 Barnsley

A tricky away game at the valley brought another solid performance from Barnsley, keeping the sheet clean until the 82nd minute when Zheng Zhi netted a goal for the home side. However Barnsley fought back, and in injury time substitute Kim Christensen scored his first goal for the club to earn a dramatic away point.

Match Eleven – Barnsley 1–1 Burnley

Barnsley extend their unbeaten run to seven games with this draw, going one goal down after ten minutes with Andy Gray finding the net for the away side but Miguel Mostto scored his first goal for Barnsley in the second half to bring them a point from this game.

Match Twelve – Hull City 3–0 Barnsley

A debacle of a performance saw Fraizer Campbell bag a brace and Dean Marney score late on condemn the Reds to their first defeat in seven games.

Match Thirteen – Leicester City 2–0 Barnsley

The disappointing form continued for Barnsley, with goals from Collins John and Patrick Kisnorbo condemning them to another defeat.

Match Fourteen – Barnsley 1–0 Preston North End

The Reds claimed a win over struggling Preston courtesy of a first-half header from Istvan Ferenczi, in his first match after a month-long injury spell. The away side had a huge chance to equalize in the dying seconds of the game when they were awarded a penalty, but keeper Heinz Muller made a stunning save to tip it round the post and maintain his clean sheet.

Match Fifteen – Barnsley 2–1 Blackpool

Brian Howard opened the scoring in this match with his fourth penalty of the season, after a foul on Sam Togwell. Blackpool had a man sent off in the second half but continued to fight back bravely. Istvan Ferenczi widened the gap in the second half with another goal from a header, but Blackpool pulled one back minutes later thanks to Keith Southern. The away team continued to create chances but Barnsley maintained their lead thanks to another superb performance from goalkeeper Heinz Muller.

Match Sixteen – Wolverhampton Wanderers 1–0 Barnsley

A solitary goal by Neill Collins was enough to see Wolves overcome the Reds. Hungarian forward Istvan Ferenczi was denied his third goal in as many games when his header was controversially ruled out by female assistant Amy Rayner.

Match Seventeen – Barnsley 3–2 Watford

A thrilling victory at Oakwell. Two goals in quick succession from Brian Howard and Martin Devaney look like giving Barnsley a 2 – 0 lead going into half time but two headers from Watford defender Danny Shittu made things all square going into the break.
In the second half, Barnsley won win after Richard Lee's blunder from Brian Howard cross.

Match Eighteen – Sheffield Wednesday 1–0 Barnsley

The South Yorkshire derby was settled on the hour mark by a header from Akpo Sodje. Barnsley fail again to win at Hillsborough.

Match Nineteen – Ipswich Town 0–0 Barnsley

Barnsley claimed an unexpected point away at Portman Road, becoming the first team this season to leave Ipswich with anything. In a pretty even game there were chances at both ends but Barnsley would have been the happier of the two teams after ending Ipswich's 100% home record and ended their own run of four straight away defeats.

Match Twenty – Barnsley 1–0 Wolverhampton Wanderers

A comfortable home win for Barnsley in a match where the away side managed only one shot on target. Istvan Ferenczi scored the only goal of the game just after half time, and minutes later goalkeeper Heinz Muller made a spectacular penalty save at the other end.

Match Twenty-One – Barnsley 0–0 Crystal Palace

Another goalless draw for Barnsley thanks to another strong performance from Heinz Muller, holding off the Crystal Palace attackers and retaining another point.

Match Twenty-Two – Sheffield United 1–0 Barnsley

This yorkshire derby was decided only by a Matthew Kilgallon goal in the 64th minute of play, Barnsley again failing to produce any away goals.

Match Twenty-Three – Bristol City 3–2 Barnsley

The first four goals of the game came in quick succession towards the end of the first half, to make the scoreline 2–2 at half time. The reds twice took the lead through a 25-yard strike from Jon Macken, and a header Dennis Souza, however both of which were cancelled out by Enoch Showunmi. Ultimately, a last-minute goal from Darren Byfield put the home side in front and denied any points for Barnsley.

Match Twenty-Four – Barnsley 3–3 Stoke City

This controversial encounter brought a total of three penalties, one for each side in the first half and the final one awarded in the final minutes of play, allowing Stoke to take a point from Oakwell despite Jon Macken's second and third goals of the season. Brian Howard also found the net but said penalties and a well worked set piece gave Liam Lawrence a hat-trick to save Stoke.

Match Twenty-Five – Barnsley 2–2 Southampton

Sam Togwell opened the scoring in this match after only sixteen seconds of play, and it was Jamal Campbell-Ryce with a rising drive to put Barnsley 2–0 up at half time. However, a brace from substitute Bradley Wright-Phillips evened the score in the second half.

Match Twenty-Six – Scunthorpe United 2–2 Barnsley

Another high-scoring draw saw the Reds come from behind to draw with Scunthorpe at Glanford Park. Ian Morris and Kelly Youga scored just before and just after half-time respectively to put Scunthorpe 2–0 up. However, Grant McCann pulled the deficit back with a firm volley after his free-kick was blocked by the wall. Andy Crosby handled Miguel Mostto's shot in the dying seconds and Brian Howard netted in the seventh minute of added time.

FA Cup 3rd Round – Barnsley 2–1 Blackpool

Barnsley made a late comeback against Blackpool in order to progress past the third round of the FA Cup for the first time since 1999. They went a goal down after half an hour after a goal from David Fox, and goalkeeper Heinz Muller had to be substituted at half-time due to injury, with reserve keeper Kyle Letheren coming on. With 15 minutes remaining, defender Stephen Foster scored his first goal for Barnsley with a crafty back-heel from a corner and four minutes later 19 year old striker Michael Coulson put his team ahead.

Match Twenty-Seven – Barnsley 1 – 3 Norwich City

A strong first half performance but a poor second half saw Barnsley lose at Oakwell for the first time since opening day. Martin Devaney scored an impressive opener to put them a goal ahead at half-time, but the opposition came away with three goals in the second. Ched Evans, Mark Fotheringham and Dion Dublin got the Canaries' goals.

Match Twenty-Eight – Queens Park Rangers 2–0 Barnsley

Barnsley continue to struggle in the league, defeat at QPR meant that they haven't tasted victory in the Championship for eight games, and drop to 16th place in the league. Patrick Agyemang and Rowan Vine consigned the Reds to defeat.

FA Cup 4th Round – Southend United 0–1 Barnsley

A fantastic strike by Jamal Campbell-Ryce against his old employers and an inspired performance by Heinz Muller ensured that the Reds sealed their place in the Fifth Round of the FA Cup. This was the Reds' first away win since they beat Southampton away back in September.

Match Twenty-Nine – Barnsley 1–0 Colchester United

A goal from Jon Macken, who had just signed a permanent deal to return to Oakwell after his loan spell, sealed Barnsley's first league win since early December to re-affirm the team's strong home record. The result was even better given the fact that keeper Heinz Muller played nearly the whole game on just one leg. Stephen Foster was forced to take his goal-kicks for him.

Match Thirty – Coventry City 4–0 Barnsley

For the second time this season, and third meeting in a row, Coventry secured an emphatic victory over the reds. Leon Best opened the scoring just before half time. The second half was evenly matched but in the last twenty minutes the hosts ran riot with Julian Gray, Jay Tabb and Best all scoring. A dismal afternoon was for the visitors summed up as Brian Howard and Dennis Souza began fighting amongst each other at 3–0.

Match Thirty-One – Barnsley 2–1 West Bromwich Albion

The tykes maintained their strong home form with an impressive win over current league leaders West Bromwich Albion, a goal each in the first half for strikers Jon Macken and Daniel Nardiello. West Brom fought back in the second half and James Morrison pulled one back for his team, but Barnsley managed to hold on for the win.

Match Thirty-Two – Plymouth Argyle 3–0 Barnsley

A nightmare start to the match for Barnsley, as defender Lewin Nyatanga was shown a straight red card after just three minutes of play, and Steven MacLean opened the scoring for Plymouth from the resulting free kick. Down to ten men, Barnsley managed to hold off the home side until the final 15 minutes, when Plymouth débutante Jamie Mackie scored twice to make the win decisive.

FA Cup 5th Round – Liverpool 1–2 Barnsley

Barnsley pulled off a huge shock in the fifth round of the FA Cup, beating Liverpool at Anfield to progress to the quarter finals for the first time since 1999. Dirk Kuyt opened the scoring in the first half, but Stephen Foster headed in the equaliser in the second while loaned goalkeeper Luke Steele made several saves to keep Barnsley in the game. It was captain Brian Howard with the last-gasp winner, a shot struck firmly into the bottom corner, after being denied a stonewall penalty

Match Thirty-Three – Norwich City 1–0 Barnsley

Reds boss Simon Davey named an unchanged side from the side that beat Liverpool. However, Barnsley made a poor performance with the only goal of the game going to Norwich's Jamie Cureton in the 26th minute of the game.

Match Thirty-Four – Barnsley 0–0 Queens Park Rangers

A poor game played out in shocking conditions ended 0–0 between the Reds and QPR. Reds striker Istvan Ferenczi missed two sitters in the first half but the wind got the better of both sides.

Match Thirty-Five – Barnsley 0–0 Sheffield Wednesday

Another game affected by wind ended 0–0. Neither team had the best of a poor game but arguably Luke Steele kept Wednesday out and the game ended with Rob Kozluk being sent off in the dying minutes for two lunges on Marcus Tudgay.

Match Thirty-Six – Blackpool 1–1 Barnsley

Barnsley were outplayed in this away game but managed to hold out for the draw. The first goal came from Gary Taylor-Fletcher after 20 minutes, but Jamal Campbell-Ryce bagged an equaliser just before the break.

FA Cup 6th Round – Barnsley 1–0 Chelsea

A Kayode Odejayi second-half header was sufficient to dump the holders out of the FA Cup and hand a semi-final place to Barnsley. In the first half, Barnsley created the better chances up front and defended extremely well. After the break, Chelsea pressed forward but were still unable to create a clear-cut chance thanks to a very crowded Barnsley penalty area. The home side eventually exploited the gaps left open at the back when Martin Devaney delivered a perfect ball into the area for Kayode Odejayi to nod it into the net and score his first goal since September.

Match Thirty-Seven – Barnsley 4–1 Ipswich Town

Fresh from their sensational FA Cup performance, Barnsley managed to pull off their biggest win of the season against promotion candidates Ipswich. Pablo Couñago opened the scoring for the away side after 20 minutes, but five minutes later it was Brian Howard with the equaliser. Early in the second half, Jon Macken headed the ball in from a corner to put Barnsley in front and then with 10 minutes remaining there was drama as Jamal Campbell-Ryce was brought down in the area and a penalty given, which Brian Howard scored for his 12th league goal of the season. A late corner then resulted in what initially went down as an own goal by David Wright, but Brian Howard was given the match ball suggesting that he may try and claim that goal and his first senior hat trick.

Match Thirty-Eight – Crystal Palace 2–0 Barnsley

Barnsley were unable to continue their winning form against playoff-chasers Crystal Palace, and they've still only won a single away game in the league all season. No goals at either end in the first half, but Tom Soares put the home side in front in the first minute of the second half then a late goal from James Scowcroft wrapped up all three points for Palace.

Match Thirty-Nine – Barnsley 0–1 Sheffield United

A single goal from Billy Sharp was enough to prove decisive in this Yorkshire derby, a loss which sees Barnsley drop to within two points of the relegation zone; their most precarious position all season.

Match Forty – Burnley 2–1 Barnsley

Quickfire goals from Wade Elliott and Kyle Lafferty put the home side two goals up here. Although Brian Howard managed to pull one back before the break, Barnsley couldn't quite manage an equaliser; Jon Macken coming closest when his effort hit the bar.

FA Cup Semi Final – Barnsley 0–1 Cardiff City

Barnsley's brave FA Cup run came to an end at the semi-final stage as Cardiff came away with a 1–0 victory at Wembley to reach the cup final held at the same venue. Joe Ledley gave Cardiff an early lead with a goal in the ninth minute, but the decisive moment for Barnsley was when their quarter-final hero, Kayode Odejayi, missed a great chance when through on goal. Ultimately it would prove the best opportunity Barnsley had to draw level of the entire match.

Match Forty-One – Watford 0–3 Barnsley

Manager Simon Davey kept faith in controversial striker Kayode Odejayi by giving him another starting place in this match, and was rewarded with two goals from him; his second and third league goals of the season. Stephen Foster's headed goal from a Diego León corner made this a surprisingly big win for Barnsley against the Premiership contenders, and only their second away win all season.

Match Forty-Two – Preston North End 1–2 Barnsley

Barnsley continued to claw themselves away from the relegation spots with an away win at Preston; their second of the week and fourth of the season. A free kick from January signing Diego León followed by a foul on Jamal Campbell-Ryce inside the area which led to a Jon Macken penalty secured this win, regardless of a Stephen Foster own goal at the 
other end.

Match Forty-Three – Barnsley 1–3 Hull City

After two successive away wins, the Reds came back to Oakwell and lost 3–1 to promotion chasing Hull. Dean Marney netted a penalty, Ian Ashbee headed home and Dean Windass made it 3. Istvan Ferenczi headed a late consolation.

Match Forty-Four – Barnsley 0–1 Leicester City

Against fellow strugglers Leicester a single second-half goal from Iain Hume was the deciding factor in a game which could have secured Championship survival for Barnsley.

Match Forty-Five – Barnsley 3–0 Charlton Athletic

Barnsley finally secured their survival with a big win over Charlton. Jamal Campbell-Ryce opened the scoring after just 10 minutes, and then Lewin Nyatanga extended the lead from a Diego León corner. Jon Macken's late headed goal from a Marciano van Homoet cross made all three points a certainty.

Match Forty-Six – Cardiff City 3–0 Barnsley

A typical end of season performance by Barnsley ended up in a 3–0 defeat to the side that knocked them out of the FA Cup at the semi-final stage. Paul Parry, Kevin McNaughton and the semi-final winner Joe Ledley bagged the goals.

Goalscorers
League Goals (Cup Goals) 
  Brian Howard 13 (1)
  Jon Macken 8
  Istvan Ferenczi 5 (1)
  Martin Devaney 4
  Kayode Odejayi 3 (1)
  Grant McCann 3
  Jamal Campbell-Ryce 3 (1)
  Dennis Souza 2
  Stephen Foster 1 (2)
  Diego León 1
  Daniel Nardiello 1
  Lewin Nyatanga 1
  Sam Togwell 1
  Kim Christensen 1
  Dominik Werling 1
  Miguel Mostto 1
  Michael Coulson (1)
  Paul Reid (1)

References

Barnsley F.C. seasons
Barnsley